{{Infobox concert
| concert_tour_name = Lynyrd Skynyrd 1991 Tour
| artist = Lynyrd Skynyrd
| album = Lynyrd Skynyrd 1991
| start_date = July 17, 1991
| end_date = February 26, 1992
| number_of_shows = 64
| last_tour = Lynyrd Skynyrd Tribute Tour (1987–1988)
| this_tour = Lynyrd Skynyrd 1991 Tour (1991–1992)
| next_tour = The Last Rebel Tour (1992–1993)
}}Lynyrd Skynyrd 1991 Tour' was a tour in support of the band's first post-plane crash album Lynyrd Skynyrd 1991''. The tour took place in the United States, Canada and Europe.

The first show of the tour, in Baton Rouge, was the first time the band had sung its classic anthem "Free Bird" since the 1977 plane crash, which had occurred as the band flew to a show in Baton Rouge. Ticket holders for that 1977 show were admitted free.

Typical setlist
 Smokestack Lightning
 I Know A Little
 Saturday Night Special
 You Got That Right
 What's Your Name
 Keeping The Faith
 Good Thing
 Don't Ask Me No Questions
 Simple Man
 The Ballad Of Curtis Loew 
 Southern Women 
 I've Seen Enough
 That Smell
 Gimme Three Steps
 Call Me The Breeze
 Backstreet Crawler
 Sweet Home Alabama
 Free Bird

Tour dates

Personnel
 Johnny Van Zant – vocals
 Gary Rossington – guitar
 Ed King – guitar
 Randall Hall – guitar
 Leon Wilkeson – bass
 Billy Powell – keyboard, piano
 Kurt Custer – drums
 Artimus Pyle – drums (left the tour August 2)
 Dale Krantz-Rossington – backing vocals
 Debbie Bailey – backing vocals

References

External links
Chrome Oxide Skynyrd Set List
http://articles.chicagotribune.com/1991-08-18/features/9103010353_1_steve-gaines-johnny-van-zant-backup-singer-cassie-gaines
http://articles.courant.com/1991-07-25/entertainment/0000213828_1_johnny-van-zant-tribute-tour-gary-rossington

1991 concert tours
1992 concert tours
Lynyrd Skynyrd concert tours